The 717th Tank Battalion was an Independent tank battalion which fought in the European Theater of Operations during World War II. They were attached to the 79th Infantry Division.

The Battalion entered the war against Germany during its final stages, with its first shot in combat during the crossing of the Rhine River on 24 March 1945.

Photo Gallery

References

 United States Army, "717th Tank Battalion record" (1946). World War Regimental Histories. 25.

Battalions of the United States Army in World War II
Tank battalions of the United States Army